Cilacap Regency (also spelt: Chilachap, old spelling: Tjilatjap,) is a regency in the southwestern part of Central Java province in Indonesia. Its capital is the town of Cilacap.

Cilacap Regency covers an area of 2,252.50 km2 (including the 115-km2 Nusakambangan Island off the south coast), and it had a population of 1,642,107 at the 2010 Census and 1,944,857 at the 2020 Census; the official estimate as at mid 2021 was 1,963,824. The languages used in Cilacap are the Javanese language and Sundanese language, but most people can speak Indonesian. The dialect used is Banyumasan.

There are schools of all levels in Cilacap and several higher-learning institutions. There are several academies such as Akademi Maritim Nusantara (National Maritime Academy). A polytechnic, called Politeknik Cilacap, was established in 2008 and offers education in Engineering, Electronics and Informatics.

Administrative Districts
Cilacap Regency comprises twenty-four districts (kecamatan), tabulated below with their areas and their populations at the 2010 Census and the 2020 Census, together with the official estimates as at mid 2021. The table also includes the locations of the district administrative centres, the number of administrative villages (rural desa and urban kelurahan) in each district and its post code. The three districts comprising Cilacap town formerly formed an Autonomous city, but have now been subsumed back into the regency.

Notes: (a) except the desa of Cigintung (which has a post code of 53222) and the desa of Limbangan (which has a post code of 53232).(b) includes the population but excludes the area (115 km2) of the offshore island of Pulau Nusakambangan.

Cilacap Town

The town of Cilacap is also a sea port on the southern coast of the island of Java. The port is one of only a few that exist on the southern coast that can service shipping of reasonable tonnage. The nearest safe anchorage east is Pacitan. The city's harbor is protected by Nusakambangan, an island best known as the site of several high-security correctional facilities although there are also hopes that the island can be developed as a tourist hub.  Nusakambangan sheltered Cilacap from the worst of the 2004 tsunami. Nevertheless, the disaster took 147 lives, devastated beaches, damaged 435 fishing boats and inflicted material losses amounting to about Rp 86 billion (around $9 million).

During World War II Cilacap was an important departure point for people fleeing the Japanese invasion, especially Dutch colonists. Many left the Dutch East Indies by boat or seaplane, the majority heading for Broome in Western Australia.

The port is a hub for national or international trade. The town's Tunggul Wulung Airport provides scheduled airline services to Jakarta and Semarang.

Cilacap is the site of many industrial plants, a geothermal power plant, a cement plant (Holcim Indonesia), and one of Pertamina (Indonesia's national petroleum company) processing units in Indonesia. The site has the largest production capacity, producing the most diverse kinds of products among other Pertamina units.

The town of Cilacap offers several tourist attractions highlighting Banyumasan culture. The town has a number of beaches, two of the most popular being Teluk Penyu (close to the center of town), but these are somewhat fouled from leakage of the shipping vessels docked adjacent to this and Widara Payung. Nearby the Teluk Penyu beach is also an old Dutch fortress called Benteng Pendem. This fortress was built in stages during 1861-1879 by the Dutch East Indies Army.

Segara Anakan Bay
In early 2012 Segara Anakan Bay's area is only 600 hectares, reduced from 700 hectares in 2005 after dredging. Heavy sedimentation from the Citanduy River (which is located on the border of Ciamis Regency and Cilacap Regency) caused it. To overcome the sedimentation in Segara Anakan Bay, Ciamis Regency has agreed, if a new canal from Citanduy River pass their area and exit in Nusawiru near Pangandaran Beach.

Climate
Cilacap has a tropical rainforest climate (Af) with heavy to very heavy rainfall year-round. The following climate data is for the town of Cilacap.

Tourism gallery

References

External links